The 2000 Pepsi Southern 500 presented by Kmart, the 51st running of the event, was the 24th race of the 2000 NASCAR Winston Cup Series season. It was held at Darlington Raceway on September 3, 2000. The race was scheduled for 367 laps but was shortened to 328 laps due to rain. Bobby Labonte of Joe Gibbs Racing won the race.

Darrell Waltrip would lead his final Cup Series lap in his career on lap 48. Rick Mast would also lead a lap for the final time in his career on lap 304. The Mayfield-Marcis tango didn't bring out a caution. Mayfield thought he was clear out of 2, then got hooked in the wall by Marcis. Mayfield slid down the track, sparks flying, right-front tore up, but the green flag remained active.

Qualifying

Full qualifying results 

OP: qualified via owners points

PC: qualified as past champion

PR: provisional

QR: via qualifying race

* - had to qualify on time

Results

Race statistics
 Time of race: 4:08:20
 Average Speed: 
 Pole Speed: 169.444
 Cautions: 9 for 69 laps
 Margin of Victory: under caution
 Lead changes: 22
 Percent of race run under caution: 21%         
 Average green flag run: 28.8 laps

References

Pepsi Southern 500
Pepsi Southern 500
Pepsi Southern 500
NASCAR races at Darlington Raceway